Martin Wörsdörfer (born 20 January 1972) is a Dutch politician who has served as a member of the House of Representatives between 23 March 2017 and 30 March 2021. He is a member of the People's Party for Freedom and Democracy (VVD). Since May 2022 he is an alderman of Oostzaan.

References

1972 births
Living people
21st-century Dutch politicians
Members of the House of Representatives (Netherlands)
People's Party for Freedom and Democracy politicians
20th-century Dutch people
People from Enschede